The yellow-breasted chat (Icteria virens) is a large songbird found in North America, and is the only member of the family Icteriidae. It was once a member of the New World warbler family, but in 2017, the American Ornithological Society moved it to its own family. Its placement is not definitively resolved.

Taxonomy 
The yellow-breasted chat was formerly considered the largest member of the family Parulidae, but following taxonomic studies, it was moved to the monotypic family Icteriidae. Although Icteriidae is a distinct family from the New World blackbirds (Icteridae), which have a very similar name, taxonomic studies support them as being the closest living relatives of one another, and in a 2019 study Carl Oliveros and colleagues actually classified the yellow-breasted chat as a member of Icteridae. In addition, the former grouping of the yellow-breasted chat as a warbler was not too far off, as Parulidae is now considered the sister group to the clade containing Icteridae and Icteriidae.

Distribution and habitat
The yellow-breasted chat is found throughout North America. It  breeds from the southern plains of Canada to central Mexico, and mainly migrates to Mexico and Central America for the winter, although some may overwinter in coastal areas farther north. This species occurs in areas where dense shrubbery is common. Today, its habitat often consists of abandoned farmland and other rural areas where overgrown vegetation proliferates.

Description
If they are considered part of the family Parulidae (New World warblers), yellow-breasted chats are the largest species of parulid. In fact, they can often weigh more than twice as much as other parulid species, but their membership in this taxonomic family is disputed.

These birds have olive upper parts with white bellies and bright-yellow throats and breasts. Other signature features of yellow-breasted chats are their large, white eye rings, and blackish legs. When seen, this species is unlikely to be mistaken for any other bird.

Biology

The yellow-breasted chat is a shy, skulking species of bird, often being heard but not seen. The breeding habitats of this species are dense, brushy areas and hedgerows. The nests of these birds are bulky cups made of grasses, leaves, strips of bark, and stems of weeds, and lined with finer grasses, wiry plant stems, pine needles, and sometimes roots and hair. They lay from three to five, creamy-white eggs with reddish-brown blotches or speckles, incubated by the female, which hatch in 11 to 12 days. Both parents tend the young, which fledge in roughly 8 to 11 days. Chats are apparently vigilant guards of their nests, as parasitism by brown-headed cowbirds is not as frequent as with other cup-nest builders. They are not as monogamous, though, as other warblers. In one study in central Kentucky, DNA fingerprinting revealed that 17% of 29 yellow-breasted chat nestlings were not sired by the male of the social pair and three of nine broods contained at least one extra-pair nestling.

Yellow-breasted chats are omnivorous birds, and forage in dense vegetation. Mostly, this species feeds on insects and berries, including blackberries and wild grapes. Insects up to moderate sizes, including grasshoppers, bugs, beetles, weevils, bees, wasps, tent caterpillars, ants, moths, and mayflies, are typically preyed upon and are gleaned from dense vegetation. Other invertebrates, including spiders, are occasionally eaten, as well. Uniquely for a passerine of its size, the chat occasionally grips food with its feet before it eats.

The songs of these birds are an odd, variable mixture of cackles, clucks, whistles, and hoots. Their calls are harsh chak'''s. Unlike most warblers, this species has been known to mimic the calls of other birds. Thus, less experienced field birdwatchers sometimes overlook chats after mistaking their song for species such as grey catbirds and brown thrashers, which share similar habitat preferences and skulking habits, though are generally much more abundant. During the breeding season, chats are at their most conspicuous, as they  usually sing from exposed locations and even fly in the open while gurgling their songs.

Status
Yellow-breasted chats are declining in eastern North America due to habitat loss and degradation due to deforestation and urban development. This species, though less vulnerable than other cup nesters, is still sometimes victim to brood parasitism from brown-headed cowbirds that have taken advantage of the fragmentation of eastern forests to expand their range during the last century. The species still occurs over a wide range, though,  and is considered to be of least concern globally.

References

Further reading
 
 Sibley, David Allen.  The Sibley Field Guide to Birds of Western North America'',

External links

 Yellow-breasted chat at AviBase
 Yellow-breasted chat at CT Department of Environmental Protection
 Yellow-breasted chat Species Account – Cornell Lab of Ornithology
 Yellow-breasted chat – USGS Patuxent Bird Identification InfoCenter
 Stamps (for Antigua and Barbuda)
 Yellow-breasted chat videos on the Internet Bird Collection
 Yellow-breasted chat photo gallery VIREO
 Yellow-breasted chat bird sound

yellow-breasted chat
Birds of the United States
yellow-breasted chat
yellow-breasted chat